"Never Had It So Good" is a song co-written and recorded by American country music artist Mary Chapin Carpenter.  It was released in September 1989 as the second single from the album State of the Heart.  The song reached #8 on the Billboard Hot Country Singles & Tracks chart. Carpenter wrote and produced the song with John Jennings.

Content
The song is about a relationship with Carpenter's ex-boyfriend at the time, telling him that he "never had it so good" now that he is in another relationship. Carpenter said of the song, "when I wrote it, I had no idea it would wind up on the radio. Neither did he."

Critical reception
An uncredited review in Cashbox was favorable toward the song, stating that "This cut brings out Carpenter’s distinct vocals like never before and lets us know just how beautifully she can handle a tune guaranteed to conquer radio airplay. 'Never Had It So Good'[...]expresses the true contentment within a relationship—and rising star Carpenter has never sounded so good."

Chart performance

Year-end charts

References

1989 singles
Mary Chapin Carpenter songs
Songs written by Mary Chapin Carpenter
Columbia Records singles
Songs written by John Jennings (musician)
1989 songs